702 (pronounced "Seven-Oh-Two"), named after the area code of their hometown of Las Vegas, Nevada, is an American girl group, with the final and most known line-up consisting of Kameelah Williams and sisters Irish and LeMisha Grinstead.

The group was originally a quartet featuring the Grinstead sisters, which included identical twins Irish and Orish (born June 2, 1980, in Houston, TX), their older sister LeMisha (born June 10, 1978, in Houston, TX), and Amelia Childs whom they debuted as featured artists on Subway's hit single "This Lil' Game We Play". Amelia and Orish were removed from the group due to Mike Bivins not favoring their voices and were briefly replaced by classmates Tiffany Villarreal and Kameelah Williams (born March 8, 1978, in Las Vegas, NV. Six months before their debut single was released Tiffany would depart the group. Continuing as a trio, they released their debut single "Steelo" with great success.

Their first released album No Doubt in 1996, sold 500,000 copies in the United States. In 1999 the trio released the most famous 702 song called "Where My Girls At?" on the album 702 which gained a high level of success for the group selling half a million copies in the United States. For undisclosed conflicting personal reasons with the record label, Kameelah Williams distanced herself from the Grinstead sisters after the release of that album, and was replaced by Cree La'More, a solo singer who Irish and LeMisha personally picked to join the group. The new line-up released a single called "Pootie Tangin'" for the Pootie Tang soundtrack, though shortly after this, Kameelah Williams returned to the group, and for undisclosed reasons, Cree La'More left the ensemble. With the return of Kameelah Williams, they released the album Star which is mostly remembered for the single "I Still Love You". The group then disbanded in 2006. They regrouped again in 2017, and appeared at the 2017 Soul Train Music Awards.

History
In Las Vegas, sisters LeMisha and Irish Grinstead were students at the Las Vegas Academy of Performing Arts. Irish, her twin sister Orish, and LeMisha occasionally sang in the lobby of Caesars Palace where they were discovered by actor/comedian Sinbad.  He visited their home to convince their parents to send the trio to Atlanta for a convention and music competition.  Though the girls missed the deadline for entry, Sinbad used his name to get them in. "Sweeta than Suga," as they were then called (Sinbad suggested the name), came in second in the competition.  As the convention was nearing a close, they met Michael Bivins (of New Edition and Bell Biv DeVoe) who agreed to work with the sisters. They were briefly joined by singer Amelia Childs. The reconfigured group was christened "702," which is Las Vegas' area code, a name that Bivins suggested.

1995: Pre-Debut; Group Reconfiguration
After they made their recorded debut on Subway's hit single "This Lil' Game We Play", Soon after Amelia and Orish were removed from the group due to poor vocals and replaced by Kameelah Williams and Tiffany Villarreal who were classmates at the academy.  After 6 months in the group Tiffany would depart for a solo career. Therefore leading to the most known and final line-up as a trio consisting Meelah, Lemisha and Irish. Orish did not rejoin the group however added background vocals on their first album and also was a stand-in for any absent members. Bivins continued to work with different producers and songwriters to get the right feel for their first album

1996–1998: Rise to fame

Their debut album, No Doubt shot to No. 1 on Top Heatseekers. Missy Elliott co-wrote & produced 4 songs on the album including the smash hit single "Steelo" and its remix.  The album spawned the 3 hit singles: "Steelo", "All I Want" and "Get It Together".  "Steelo" with altered lyrics was used as the theme song to the Nickelodeon television show Cousin Skeeter and "All I Want" was featured in the Nickelodeon movie Good Burger, based on the sketch from series All That, where they also performed. "Get It Together" exploded by giving the group a No. 3 R&B single and a No. 10 Pop single on the Billboard charts.  The album earned them a Soul Train Lady of Soul Award in 1997. It sold over 500,000 copies worldwide.  In addition to the album, 702 opened for New Edition, Keith Sweat, and Blackstreet during the 1996–97 New Edition reunion tour.  They also appeared on Elliott's debut album Supa Dupa Fly on her 1998 song "Beep Me 911", which reached No. 14 on the UK Singles Chart.  They also sang with Busta Rhymes' new artist Rampage.  "My Friend" was featured on the soundtrack to Men in Black.  In 1998, 702 made cameos in the sitcoms Sister, Sister and Moesha.

1999–2000: Career development

After going gold with their debut album, they released their self-titled second album, 702.  The first single from the album "Where My Girls At?" was written and produced by Missy Elliott and made No. 4 on the Billboard Hot 100 and went gold.  The single spent months on the chart, became nominated for the song of the year, and gained them a 1999 Soul Train Lady of Soul Award nomination. The album made the Top 40 on Billboard 200 and earned them a 2000 Soul Train Lady of Soul Award nomination and sold more than 500,000 copies going gold. 702, before releasing their second album, had also sung the national anthem for the WNBA season opener. 702 was also a part of Brandy's Never Say Never tour. On June 18, 702's LeMisha gave birth to her son Tony Fields II and left to take care of her new-born. Orish took her place during LeMisha's brief absence.  They also made a cameo in the 1999 ABC-TV movie Double Platinum starring Brandy and Diana Ross. 702 also signed a deal with Wilhelmina Models.  "You Don't Know" and "Gotta Leave" were released but failed reach the success "Where My Girls At? did. In 2000, 702 along with Eric Benét were Brian McKnight's opening act for his tour supporting his album Back at One.

2001–2002: Hiatus and "Pootie Tangin"
Once the hype for the second album died down, 702 took a hiatus from the spotlight. Kameelah Williams decided to part from the group and go solo.  She briefly became the new protégé of Faith Evans and signed a deal to be managed by Faith and her husband, Todd Russaw, under their Pedigree MGI Management. Kameelah sang backup and wrote three songs for Faith Evans' album, Faithfully. She also sang backup for Missy Elliott’s song "Take Away", the third single from her 2001 album Miss E...So Addictive. In an interview with the SoulBack R&B Podcast in 2019, Pamela Long confirmed that Meelah was in fact a part of Total and recorded music with the group.
 
The Grinstead sisters, the remaining members of 702, decided to retake their place in the spotlight and enlisted Cree Le'More now known as just "Cree", to replace Meelah. Under the revamped 702, they recorded the lead single "Pootie Tangin" for the Chris Rock movie, Pootie Tang.  The song failed to make any charts but earned them a 2002 Soul Train Lady of Soul Award nomination.

2003–2006: Star

With Williams returning to the group, replacing Cree Lamore, 702 returned to record their third album. They released the album Star in March 2003, and it made the Top 50 on the Billboard 200. The group worked with singers Mario Winans, Faith Evans and Clipse
and producers The Neptunes, Mike City, and Kevin "She'kspere" Briggs.  The single "Star" and "I Still Love You" did not make the Billboard Hot 100, but did make Hot R&B/Hip-Hop Singles & Tracks. "Star" at No. 98 and I Still Love You" at No. 49. The album earned them two Soul Train Lady of Soul Award nominations later in 2003.  Also in 2003, 702 shared lead vocals on the track "Gamble It" from the album "Emotions" by Sirena.  Irish Grinstead appeared in The Brewster Project in 2004.  The group disbanded after their third studio album. In 2006, 702 regrouped on the independent album E Sharp Presents. The composition of that however did not include Meelah but LeMisha, Irish and Orish Grinstead. The cd cover image from their second album "702" appears on the cover. The group then disbanded in 2006 continuing on solo careers.

2007-present: Solo endeavors and reunions
LeMisha Grinstead, under the name "LeMisha 702", in 2007 released a song titled "What I Got" that appeared on the independent album E Sharp Presents vol. II. She later got married, and is currently the wedding chapel manager at Treasure Island Hotel and Casino in Las Vegas, Nevada. Lemisha's son is also Tony Fields II who is a football linebacker for the Cleveland Browns of the National Football League (NFL).

On April 20, 2008, Original founding member Orish Grinstead, twin sister of Irish, died from kidney failure at the age of 27. 

In 2010, Williams confirmed via her official Twitter that she was now permanently solo and was working on her very own full-length solo LP.

BET Presents: The Encore

In May 2021, Irish and LeMisha Grinstead were officially announced as cast members for the BET Network original reality television show BET Presents: The Encore. The 10-episode series, described as a "one-of-a-kind music experiment to become the next big musical sensation" includes members from platinum-selling ensembles from the 1990s and 2000s like Total, Danity Kane, 3LW, Blaque and Cherish.

Discography 

Studio albums
 No Doubt (1996)
 702 (1999)
 Star (2002)

Awards
American Music Awards

BET Awards

Soul Train Lady of Soul Awards

References

External links
 MTV.com Artist Page: 702
 BET.com News & Interview : 702
 Yahoo! Launch: 702
 702 discography at Discogs

American girl groups
American contemporary R&B musical groups
Motown artists
Musical groups established in 1994
Musical groups disestablished in 2006
Musical groups reestablished in 2017
Musical groups from Nevada
African-American girl groups
1994 establishments in Nevada
American pop girl groups
 Sibling musical groups
Universal Motown Records artists